Monia Capelli (born 15 December 1969) is a former Italian female long-distance runner who competed at individual senior level at the IAAF World Half Marathon Championships and at the IAAF World Cross Country Championships (2002).

References

External links
 

1969 births
Living people
Italian female long-distance runners
Italian female cross country runners